The 1987–88 Courage League National Division Two was the first full season of rugby union within the second tier of the English league system, currently known as the RFU Championship. Each team played one match against the other teams, playing a total of eleven matches each. There was no set date for matches, clubs having to arrange the fixtures amongst themselves. Rosslyn Park, the first champions, were promoted to the Courage League National Division One for season 1988–89 along with the runner-up, Liverpool St Helens. Although Northampton finished in last place they were not relegated to Courage League National Division Three for the following season. Almost all clubs in the national divisions reported an increase in attendances.

Participating teams

League table

Statistics

Team
 Record wins
 50 – 3     London Scottish v Northampton
 48 – 12     Saracens at Blackheath
 38 – 3     Headingley v Northampton
 34 – 0     Saracens v London Scottish
 Record away win
 48 – 12     Saracens at Blackheath
 Most points scored in a match
 60       12 – 48     Blackheath v Saracens
 58       25 – 33     Bedford v Liverpool St Helens
 Most points scored but still lost
 25        28 – 25     Richmond v Bedford
 25        33 – 25     Bedford v Liverpool St Helens
 Highest scoring draw
 24     24 – 24     London Welsh v London Scottish
 Fewest points scored in a match
 6      6 – 0     Bedford v Blackheath

Player
 Most points in a match
 26   Andy Mitchell for London Scottish v Northampton
  Most points in a season
  75   Andy Finnie for Bedford
 Most tries in a match
 3   Jerry Macklin for London Scottish v Northampton      Orsen Blewitt for Northampton v Bedford       John Roberts for Headingley v Northampton      Peter Shillingford for London Scottish v Northampton
  Most tries in a season
  10   Dave McLagan for Saracens

Sponsorship
National Division Two is part of the Courage Clubs Championship and is sponsored by Courage Brewery

See also
 English rugby union system

References

N2
RFU Championship seasons